Vanak-e Sofla (also Romanized as Vanak-e Soflá; also known as Vanak-e Pā’īn) is a village in Chenarud-e Shomali Rural District, Chenarud District, Chadegan County, Isfahan Province, Iran. At the 2006 census, its population was 105, in 23 families.

References 

Populated places in Chadegan County